Statistics of Swedish football Division 4 for the 2011 season. There are also 5 divisions that form a lower tier of Division 4 that feed into the Halland and Småland Elit divisions in Division 4.

League standings

Blekinge 2011

Bohuslän/Dalsland 2011

Note: Dals-Långeds IK - withdrew before season

Dalarna 2011

Gotland 2011

Gästrikland 2011

Göteborg A 2011

Göteborg B 2011

Halland Elit 2011

Hälsingland 2011

Jämtland/Härjedalen 2011

Medelpad 2011

Norrbotten Norra 2011

Norrbotten Södra 2011

Skåne Nordvästra 2011

Skåne Sydvästra 2011

Skåne Östra 2011

Småland Elit Västra 2011

Småland Elit Östra 2011

Stockholm Mellersta 2011

Stockholm Norra 2011

Stockholm Södra 2011

Sörmland 2011

Uppland 2011

Värmland 2011

Västerbotten Norra 2011

Västerbotten Södra 2011

Västergötland Norra 2011

Västergötland Södra 2011

Västergötland Västra 2011

Västmanland 2011

Ångermanland 2011

Örebro 2011

Östergötland Västra 2011

Östergötland Östra 2011

Footnotes

References 

Swedish Football Division 4 seasons
6